Poonch, sometimes also spelt Punchh, may refer to:

 Historical Poonch District, a district in the princely state of Jammu and Kashmir in British India, split in 1947 between:
 Poonch district, India
 Poonch Division, in Azad Kashmir, Pakistan, which includes
 Poonch District, Pakistan
 Poonch (town), the headquarters of the Indian district of Poonch
 Poonch River, a river flowing through the historical Poonch district
 Poonchh, Jhansi, a village in Uttar Pradesh, India

See also 
 Poonchi (disambiguation)
 Punch (disambiguation)